John Clapp may refer to:
John Clapp (artist), illustrator of children's books and professor
John Clapp (baseball) (1851–1904), player and manager in Major League Baseball